Melvin Lester Kohn (October 19, 1928 – March 19, 2021) was an American sociologist and past president of the American Sociological Association.  He was a professor at Johns Hopkins University and conducted research on social structure and personality.

References

1928 births
2021 deaths
American sociologists
Johns Hopkins University faculty
Presidents of the American Sociological Association